The sixth and final season of Schitt's Creek, a Canadian television sitcom created by Dan Levy and father Eugene Levy premiered on January 7, 2020 and concluded on April 7, 2020 on CBC Television, and was followed by a one-hour behind-the-scenes retrospective documentary titled Best Wishes, Warmest Regards: A Schitt's Creek Farewell. The season aired 14 episodes and saw the final appearances of the Rose Family, consisting of characters Johnny Rose, Moira Rose, David Rose & Alexis Rose.

Dan Levy initially envisioned the series ending with season five, but agreed to a sixth season after receiving a two-year renewal following the show's fourth season.

Cast and characters

Main 
 Eugene Levy as Johnny Rose
 Catherine O'Hara as Moira Rose
 Dan Levy as David Rose
 Annie Murphy as Alexis Rose
 Jennifer Robertson as Jocelyn Schitt
 Emily Hampshire as Stevie Budd
 Sarah Levy as Twyla Sands
 Noah Reid as Patrick Brewer
 Chris Elliott as Roland Schitt

Starring 
 Dustin Milligan as Ted Mullens
 John Hemphill as Bob Currie
 Karen Robinson as Ronnie Lee

Recurring 
 Rizwan Manji as Ray Butani
 Marilyn Bellfontaine as Gwen Currie
 Steve Lund as Jake

Guest 
 Richard Waugh as Herb Ertlinger
 Elizabeth McEachern as Robin
 Victor Garber as Clifton Sparks
 Saul Rubinek as Tippy Bernstein
 Henry Czerny as Artie
 Kim Roberts as Marnie
 Deborah Tennant as Marcy Brewer
 Ted Whittall as Clint Brewer

Episodes 
 Special

Reception and release

Awards and nominations 

The show received 15 of these nominations for its sixth and final season, setting a record for most Emmy nominations for a comedy series's final season. For its portrayal of LGBTQ+ people, the series received three nominations for a GLAAD Media Award for Outstanding Comedy Series, winning twice.

Release 
The first five seasons of the series maintained staggered premieres, with new episodes debuting in Canada before being broadcast in the United States. This changed for this season, with new episodes being broadcast simultaneously in Canada and the United States. The series finale aired on April 7, 2020, at 8:00 pm ET; it was followed by a one-hour behind-the-scenes retrospective documentary titled Best Wishes, Warmest Regards: A Schitt's Creek Farewell. In the United States, the series finale was Schitt's Creek's highest-rated episode ever and simulcast on Logo TV and Comedy Central, which had recently become sibling networks to Pop TV through the ViacomCBS merger.

Critical response 
The final season's consensus reads: "Witty, warm, and with just the right blend of wisdom and wisecracks, Schitt's Creeks final season is the perfect farewell to the Roses and the town that changed their lives." On Metacritic, the final season has a score of 94 out of 100, based on 4 critics, indicating "universal acclaim". Bridget Read of Vogue wrote that while the series "started off with typical fish out of water scenarios," it has "fully come into its own, with a whole cast of Twin Peaks-meets-Christopher-Guest-universe characters that are as equally endearing".

References 

Schitt's Creek
2020 Canadian television seasons